Since their first match in 2009, 55 players have represented the Afghanistan national cricket team in One Day Internationals (ODIs). A One Day International is an international cricket match between two representative teams, each having ODI status, as determined by the International Cricket Council (ICC). An ODI differs from Test matches in that the number of overs per team is limited, and that each team has only one innings.

The Afghanistan Cricket Federation was formed in 1995, but cricket was banned by the Taliban until 2000. When the ban was lifted, the team experienced a "meteoric rise through international cricket". They were admitted to the ICC as an affiliate member in 2001, and in 2006 played and beat the Marylebone Cricket Club in Mumbai. Later in 2006 they toured England, winning six out of seven matches against county second XI teams. They joined the World Cricket League in 2008, winning Divisions Five and Four in their inaugural years, and the following year won Division Three. In 2009, Afghanistan narrowly missed out on a place in the 2011 Cricket World Cup, finishing fifth in the 2009 ICC World Cup Qualifier. Their final position earnt them ODI status, and the opportunity to take part in the four-day ICC Intercontinental Cup. Their first ODI was the fifth-place play-off of the 2009 World Cup Qualifier against Scotland, which they won by 89 runs.

This list includes all players who have played at least one ODI match and is initially arranged in the order of debut appearance. Where more than one player won their first caps in the same match, those players are initially listed alphabetically at the time of debut.

Key

Players
Statistics are correct as of 30 November 2022.

See also
 List of Afghanistan Test cricketers
 List of Afghanistan T20I cricketers
 List of Afghanistan first-class cricketers
 List of Afghanistan Twenty20 International cricket records

References

Cricket
Afghanistan ODI